The discography of American boy band O-Town consists of four studio albums, an EP and ten singles. Their debut studio album, O-Town, was released on January 23, 2001 and peaked at number five on the US Billboard 200. It also charted in the top 50 of seven other countries and certified platinum in the US and Canada.

Albums

EPs

Singles

Notes

References 

Discographies of American artists
Pop music discographies